Günter Breitzke (born 29 June 1967) is a retired German football midfielder.

Honours
Borussia Dortmund
 DFL-Supercup: 1989

References

1967 births
Living people
German footballers
Borussia Dortmund players
Fortuna Düsseldorf players
Wuppertaler SV players
FC 08 Homburg players
Alemannia Aachen players
Bundesliga players
2. Bundesliga players
Association football midfielders